Lê Thị Hoàng Ngọc (born 1 July 1982 in Hưng Yên) is a Vietnamese sport shooter. At the 2012 Summer Olympics, she competed in the Women's 10 metre air pistol, finishing in 21st place, and the women's 25 metre pistol, finishing in 32nd place.

References

External links
 

Vietnamese female sport shooters
1982 births
Living people
People from Hưng Yên Province
Olympic shooters of Vietnam
Shooters at the 2012 Summer Olympics
Shooters at the 2014 Asian Games
Southeast Asian Games silver medalists for Vietnam
Southeast Asian Games bronze medalists for Vietnam
Southeast Asian Games medalists in shooting
Competitors at the 2011 Southeast Asian Games
Asian Games competitors for Vietnam
21st-century Vietnamese women
20th-century Vietnamese women